Lifting stones are heavy natural stones which people are challenged to lift, proving their strength. They are common throughout northern Europe, particularly Scotland, Wales, Iceland (where they are referred to as steintökin), Scandinavia and North West England centred around Cumbria.

Recently, lifting stones have been incorporated into the World's Strongest Man competitions, using various cast, found, or established challenge stones such as the Húsafell Stone. They also do a stylized version of an event derived from an ancient contest, in which men would see who could load the heaviest stone onto a stone wall, derived from building such a wall, where they are known as Atlas stones.

Iceland

In Iceland, lifting stones were traditionally used to qualify men for work on fishing boats. To qualify, a man would have to lift at least the hálfdrættingur stone (described below under Dritvik Stones) to hip-height onto a ledge. Lifting heavier stones would entitle the man to a greater share of the catch. The ultimate objective is to reach the 'fullsterkur' status proving you are 'fully strong' by lifting the heaviest stones. Some famous Icelandic lifting stones are described below.

Icelandic lifting stones

Húsafell Stone

The most famous of Iceland's legendary lifting stones is the Húsafell Stone, named after the west country farming estate on which it resides, about 132 km north east from Reykjavík. The triangular shaped stone which weighs 186 kg (410 lb) is said to have been crafted from a large rock over a couple of centuries ago, when a local pastor named Snorri Björnsson adopted it as the door to his Sheep and Goat pen. Nicknamed the 'Kviahellan' (pen slab) by Snorri, the stone has been since used by Strongmen as a test of strength by either simply lifting the stone to the knee and waist, or by lifting it all the way up to the chest and carrying the stone around the perimeter of the pen for 'fullsterkur' status.

Dritvik Stones
At the tip of the west coast, in Djúpalónssandur beach at the foot of Snæfellsjökull lies 4 stones which are called Dritvik Stones. Historically, the sailors and fishermen who rowed out from this port would lift the stones to prove their worth to a ship's crew and earn themselves better pay remuneration. The 4 stones are classified as:
Amlóði ("useless") at 23 kg (51 pounds)
Hálfdrættingur ("weakling") at 54 kg (119 pounds)
Hálfsterkur ("half strength") at 100 kg (220 pounds)
Fullsterkur ("full strength") at 154 kg (340 pounds)

Judas Stone
Located in the Látravík cove at the west-most point of Westfjords region, the Judas Stone earned its name more than a century ago, when local farmers repeatedly attempted to utilize it in the construction of a wall, only to have it 'betray' them like Judas by always slipping out of place due to its unbalanced nature.

Brynjolfstak Stone
The heaviest of Iceland's legendary lifting stones is the 281 kg (620 lb) Brynjólfstak Stone, a 1.5 meter long basalt located near Tálknafjörður in the Westfjords region. Legend says that the Stone was first pulled from the sea in 1845, when a mighty farmer named Brynjólfur Eggertsson asked four of the strongest men in the area to lift the giant slab on to his shoulders. From there, Brynjólfur is said to have attached the stone to him with straps and carried it uphill, to the nearby ridge where it is currently located. The stone has since been named in his honor.

Latra Stones
Also located in the Westfjords region between Tálknafjörður and Bíldudalur in the famous seabird cliffs are 5 stones called Latra Stones. For many generations, local fishermen used these stones to stay fit and gain bragging rights in their rare time on dry land. Like the Dritvik Stones, there is a hierarchy based on their size with the heaviest stone 'Alsterkur' weighing close to 200 kg (441 lb).

Leggstein Stone
This pillar-like stone which is also known as the Tomb Stone is said to mark the spot where an unfortunate farmer made a pact with the devil. As the story goes, the lazy farmer wanted a fast track to an easier, more prosperous life, so the devil offered him his dream if he could simply complete one task: lifting the 220 kg (485 lb) Leggstein stone. It's located in the middle of the Westfjords region in Heydalur near Reykjanes. The legend says the farmer is buried under the massive plinth near the stone to be carried around the plinth for his salvation.

Petursstein Stone
Near Dynjandi waterfall in the Westfjords lies a black slate stone known as the Petursstein Stone weighing 204 kg (450 lb).

Árbær Stones
Located near Árbæjarsafn in close proximity to Reykjavík are 8 stones caleed Árbær stones with the heaviest of them weighing 143 kg (315 lb).

Scotland

Scottish lifting stones

Clach cuid fir 
Gaelic for "manhood stones", originate from Scotland. Manhood stones were used for centuries as tests of strength in Scotland. Typically, a young man was welcomed into manhood when he was able to lift his clan's testing stone to waist height. There are many examples in Scotland including:
 the McGlashen Stones
 the Nicol Stones - The heavier stone weighs 138 kg (304 lbs), and the lighter stone weighs 114 kg (251 lbs) for a total of 252 kg (555.5 lbs)
 the Inver Stone (121.6 kg (268 pounds))
 the Dinnie Stones (two stones weighing 332.49 kg (733 pounds) combined. 188.02 kg (414.51 pounds) and 144.47 kg (318.5 pounds))
 the Menzies Stone (115 kg (253.5 pounds))
Both the McGlashen Stones (later known as the Atlas Stones or Castle Stones with relation to the setup) and the Dinnie Stones have been used in numerous Strongman competitions since the 1980s including World's Strongest Man, Europe's Strongest Man and Pure Strength.

Atlas Stones introduced first with the 1986 World's Strongest Man is an evolution of the classic McGlashen stones which has now become a benchmark in modern day Strongman. The competitors have to grip the stone, lap it in a squatting position and finally drive up, to load the stone on top of a podium. There's a total of five (occasionally six) spherical concrete stones of increasing weight, to be hoisted on top of a podium for each stone. In the early competitions of the 80s and 90s, these podiums were of varying height with the lightest stone requiring to be lifted approximately to a normal person's head height. The heavier the stone was, the closer it was located to the podium. From the 2000s onwards, the stones increased in weight, and the podium heights and distance from the stone were kept uniform.

Alternatively, the stone is lifted over a bar for reps, as well.

Pretty much every current Atlas Stones related world records are shared between Hafþór Júlíus Björnsson, Tom Stoltman, Travis Ortmayer, Brian Shaw and Žydrūnas Savickas.

Clachan-ultaich
A Clach-ultaich (plural ) is another type of lifting stone found in Scotland. Examples are:
 the so-called Clach-ultaich Iain Ghairbh MhicGilleChaluim Ratharsair, "the lifting stone of Iain Garbh MacGilleChaluim of Raasay", in Duntulm on the Isle of Skye. Its weight is said to be a ton.
 the Charter or Blue Stones of Dailly in Ayrshire are a pair of lifting stones located in the cemetery of Old Dailly church.
 MacLeod's Lift ( lit. "St. Kildan's Lift") on Rona, named after one John MacLeod who was at one time tacksman and steward of St Kilda.

Lifting Stane

Near Auldgirth in Dumfries and Galloway is a small farm named Liftingstane where a large stone with an iron handle once stood that was used as a test of strength.

At Old Dailly in South Ayrshire are the 'Blue or Charter Stones' that were used for trials of strength to the extent that the local council has bound them with metal bands to prevent their continued use.

The 'Leper's Charter Stone' at Kingcase in Prestwick, South Ayrshire was made of black basalt and kidney shaped, used as a lifting stane until it was broken although the parts remain, built into the walls of the old chapel.

Others
The Ardblair Stones are a series of nine concrete spheres ranging in weight from 18 to 152 kilograms. They are used in the Blairgowrie & Rattray Highland Games.

Faroe Islands
Every settlement in the Faroe Islands used to have its local lifting stone, called a hav,
derived from the verb hevja which means 'to lift'. Visiting men would be challenged by the locals to show off their strength.

One such stone is now part of a mural in the village of Mikladalur. Known as "Marjunar hav", it is said to have been lifted by Marjun - a milkmaid in the 16th century.

Wales
According to Y pedair Camp ar Hugainyn Welsh for "24 feats of a welshman", stone lifting was a common practice. Usually performed by young boys as a rite of passage into manhood. It is said that once a young boy can lift the stone to his waist he was considered a man. Furthermore, the stone was used to develop a man's strength in preparation for battle.

There was no set size, shape or weight for each stone. Stones varied, depending on what was available within the locality or by what was selected by the king of each region.

The king's Teulu ("personal army") were selected from each village or town within his borders, based upon a man's ability to lift stones, run, jump, leap, wrestle, fence, shoot a bow and arrow and throw a spear.

To date, a lifting stone "Y Garreg Orchest" is still in place in the town of Criccieth in Gwynedd, North Wales. Competitors travel from all across the UK to attempt to lift this mammoth stone. In 2015 there was one successful lift of the 28 stone Goliath.

Basque Country
Stone lifting is also a traditional Basque Country sport involving the lifting of stones, called harri jasotzea. There are several varieties, particularly using round stones and rectangular ones. The goal can be raising and dropping a stone of certain weight as many times as possible or simply raising a heavy stone once in order to beat an existing record.

Another Basque sport is the ontzi eramatea, where the weights were originally milk canisters prior to stones.

United States and other stone carrying variants
Just like traditional Scottish and Icelandic 'stone walk' or 'stone carry', athletic events involving carrying of large stones down the field of competition has become very popular in the sport of Strongman notably in the US, with several variations being used. The rules are quite simple: the competitors each pick up a pair of very heavy stones equipped with iron handles, and carry the paired stones as far down the field as they can. The length of the field varies depending on the site. This event is also known as the farmer's walk. Another popular variation is shouldering large stones.

Loon Stones
At the Loon Mountain Highland Games in New Hampshire, there's a popular ancient farmers walk event with a pair of stones which weighs  and  respectively. The event probably originated as an outgrowth of the need to clear stones from agricultural fields to create clearance cairns. In 2015, Iceland's Hafþór Júlíus Björnsson made a guest appearance and carried the stones for 140' 6" for a new world record.

Odd Haugen's Tombstone
Norwegian Strongman Odd Haugen was gifted with a  oval shaped stone on his 58th birthday and since has featured at the Arnold Strongman Classic a number of times in the Stone to Shoulder event. Only 8 Strongmen (Marunde, Licis, Kieliszkowski, Shivlyakov, Björnsson, Belsak, Thompson and Novikov) have lifted this stone to their shoulder.

Notable stone lifters
Below table summarizes the 10 greatest stone lifters in Strongman history.
No. of total career stone events against the No. of wins.

See also
Chikaraishi, the Japanese equivalent
Stone put
Steinstossen
Strongman (strength athlete)
History of physical training and fitness

References

Stones
Scottish folklore
Scandinavian folklore
Northumbrian folklore
Strongmen competitions
Scottish games